Sean mac Fergail Óicc Ó hUiccinn (died 1490) was an Irish poet.

Ó hUiccinn was an Irish poet who held the post of Chief Ollam of Ireland. His father was Farrell Óg Ó hUiccinn. His obituary is given in the Annals of the Four Masters as follows: "M1490.16 O'Higgin, i.e. John, the son of Farrell Oge, Chief Poet of Ireland, died." His surname is now anglicised Higgins. His sister, Elec Ní hUicinn, was murdered in 1471. He had at least one other sibling, Niall mac Fergal Óge Ó hUicinn, who died in 1461.

A manuscript held in Trinity College Library, Dublin has a poem by John O'Higgin on page 141, commencing "Cia cenncup" (1346 4to, min. chart., a.d. i 726-1750. h. 4. 4).

See also
 Tadg Óg Ó hÚigínn
 Tadhg Dall Ó hÚigínn
 Philip Bocht Ó hUiginn
 Tadhg Mór Ó hUiginn
 Maol Sheachluinn na n-Uirsgéal Ó hUiginn

External links
 http://www.ucc.ie/celt/published/T100005D/index.html

Medieval Irish poets
People of the Tudor period
1490 deaths
15th-century Irish poets
Year of birth unknown
Irish male poets
Irish-language writers